Satellite radio system (also: satellite system) is – according to article 1.111 of the International Telecommunication Union´s (ITU) ITU Radio Regulations (RR) – defined as «A space system using one or more artificial earth satellites.»

Each system shall be classified by the service in which it operates permanently or temporarily.

See also
Radio station
Radiocommunication service

References / sources 

 International Telecommunication Union (ITU)

Radio stations and systems ITU